The Fighting Chance is a 1955 American drama film directed by William Witney and written by Houston Branch. The film stars Rod Cameron, Julie London, Ben Cooper, Taylor Holmes, Howard Wendell and Mel Welles. The film was released on December 15, 1955 by Republic Pictures.

Plot

After a dispute over money, trainer Bill Binyon and a young jockey, Mike Gargan, quit working for thoroughbred owner Al Moreno, whose girlfriend Janet Wales leaves him as well.

Bill and Mike go to California, where they are employed by "Lucky Jim" Morrison's stable. A flirtatious Janet turns up and draws interest from both men. Mike also is infatuated with Miss Ellen, a filly he believes could become a champion racehorse.

Janet turns out to be a devious, scheming woman, attempting to make both men jealous. After she declines Mike's marriage proposal, he disappears to Mexico, where he gambles, drinks and neglects his career. Bill takes a chance by marrying Janet, but her lavish spending habits leaves them bickering and broke.

Morrison's death from a heart attack results in his horses, Miss Ellen, coming up for auction. Mike returns and outbids Bill for the filly, then reluctantly accepts a loan and partnership when Bill lends him enough money to make the purchase. With a race coming up that offers a $400,000 prize, the horse is not in perfect health, but Janet wants the money and persuades Bill and Mike to enter Miss Ellen in the race.

In the saddle, Mike has to ease up when the horse begins bleeding. Miss Ellen finishes second. A furious Janet derides both men as losers, announcing she and Bill are through. Unbeknownst to her, Bill bet on their horse across the board (win, place and show). He throws $40,000 worth of tickets in Janet's face. When she picks them up, he hits Janet with the horse's whip. Bill and Mike walk away, resuming their partnership and friendship.

Cast      
Rod Cameron as Bill Binyon
Julie London as Janet Wales
Ben Cooper as Mike Gargan
Taylor Holmes as Railbird 
Howard Wendell as Lucky Jim Morrison 
Mel Welles as Al Moreno
Bob Steele as Curly
Paul Birch as The Auctioneer
Carl Milletaire as Joe
Rodolfo Hoyos Jr. as Rico
John Damler as McKeen
Sam Scar as Proprietor

References

External links 
 
 Win Place Show "Across the Board"

1955 films
American drama films
1955 drama films
Republic Pictures films
Films directed by William Witney
1950s English-language films
1950s American films
American black-and-white films